Bryan Adams (born 1959) is a Canadian singer-songwriter and photographer.

Bryan Adams may also refer to:

 Bryan Adams (album), his self-titled debut album
 Bryan Adams (ice hockey) (born 1977), Canadian professional ice hockey player in the National Hockey League
 Bryan Adams (politician) (born 1962), Louisiana politician
 Bryan Adams High School, public secondary school located in East Dallas, Texas

See also
 Brian Adams (disambiguation)
 Ryan Adams (born 1974), American rock/country singer